The genus Fagopyrum is in the flowering plant family Polygonaceae. It includes some important food plants, such as F. esculentum (buckwheat) and F. tataricum (Tartary buckwheat). The genus is native to the Indian subcontinent, much of Indochina, and central and southeastern China. Species have been widely introduced elsewhere, throughout the Holarctic and parts of Africa and South America.

Description
Fagopyrum contains 15 to 16 species of plants, including two important crop plants, buckwheat (Fagopyrum esculentum), and Fagopyrum tataricum (Tartary buckwheat). The two have similar uses, and are classed as pseudocereals, because they are used in the same way as cereals but do not belong to the grass family Poaceae.

Within Fagopyrum, the cultivated species are in the Cymosum group, including Fagopyrum cymosum or perennial buckwheat, the artificial hybrid Fagopyrum × giganteum, and Fagopyrum homotropicum.

This genus has five-petaled flowers arranged in a compound raceme that produces laterally flowered cymose clusters.

Taxonomy
The genus Fagopyrum was first published by Philip Miller in 1754. It is placed in the tribe Fagopyreae (as the only genus) in the subfamily Polygonoideae.

Species
, Plants of the World Online accepted the following species:

Fagopyrum callianthum Ohnishi
Fagopyrum capillatum Ohnishi
Fagopyrum caudatum (Sam.) A.J.Li
Fagopyrum crispatifolium J.L.Liu
Fagopyrum cymosum (Trevir.) Meisn.
Fagopyrum densivillosum J.L.Liu
Fagopyrum esculentum Moench
Fagopyrum gilesii (Hemsl.) Hedberg
Fagopyrum gracilipedoides Ohsako & Ohnishi
Fagopyrum gracilipes (Hemsl.) Dammer
Fagopyrum homotropicum Ohnishi
Fagopyrum jinshaense Ohsako & Ohnishi
Fagopyrum kashmirianum Munshi
Fagopyrum × kuntzei Beck
Fagopyrum leptopodum (Diels) Hedberg
Fagopyrum lineare (Sam.) Haraldson
Fagopyrum longzhoushanense J.R.Shao
Fagopyrum luojishanense J.R.Shao
Fagopyrum macrocarpum Ohsako & Ohnishi
Fagopyrum pleioramosum Ohnishi
Fagopyrum pugense T.Yu
Fagopyrum qiangcai D.Q.Bai
Fagopyrum rubrifolium Ohsako & Ohnishi
Fagopyrum statice (H.Lév.) Gross
Fagopyrum tataricum (L.) Gaertn.
Fagopyrum tibeticum (A.J.Li) Adr.Sanchez & Jan.M.Burke
Fagopyrum urophyllum (Bureau & Franch.) Gross
Fagopyrum wenchuanense J.R.Shao
Fagopyrum zuogongense Q.F.Chen

See also 
 List of edible seeds

References

External links 
 
 USDA Plants Profile: Fagopyrum
 Flora of North America: Fagopyrum
 Jepson Manual Treatment: Fagopyrum
 https://web.archive.org/web/20150909164416/http://fagopyrum.uhostall.com/:  Fagopyrum Journal Archive

 
Polygonaceae genera
Crops originating from Asia
Taxa named by Philip Miller